Ted Watkins (1941 – June 2, 1968) was a Canadian football player who played for the Hamilton Tiger-Cats and Ottawa Rough Riders. He won the Grey Cup with Hamilton in 1967. He previously played college football at the University of the Pacific in Stockton, California.

In the late 1960s, Watkins was active in the Black Power movement in Toronto.

He was shot and killed in 1968 during an alleged liquor store holdup in Stockton, California, weeks before the beginning of the 1968 CFL season.

References

1941 births
1968 deaths
Canadian football wide receivers
American football wide receivers
African-American players of American football
African-American players of Canadian football
Ottawa Rough Riders players
Hamilton Tiger-Cats players
Pacific Tigers football players
Deaths by firearm in California
20th-century African-American sportspeople